The Longbow Hunters is the name of a supervillain group appearing in American comic books published by DC Comics. They are depicted as enemies of Green Arrow. The Longbow Hunters first appeared in Green Arrow Vol. 5 #31 and were created by Jeff Lemire.

The Longbow Hunters appeared in the seventh season of Arrow as assassins hired by Ricardo Diaz. Holly Elissa portrayed Red Dart, Michael Jonsson portrayed Kodiak, and Miranda Edwards played Silencer.

Fictional team history
The Longbow Hunters first appeared where they surround John Diggle following an ambush where they were assisted by Clock King who double-crossed Diggle. Richard Dragon has Brick, Count Vertigo, Killer Moth, and Red Dart surround John and states that he is going to bring Green Arrow to them.

When Green Arrow returned to Seattle after his mission of chasing Komodo and Shado, he learns from Henry Fyff and Naomi Singh that Richard Dragon took over the city. Just then, Green Arrow detects that they were followed and protects them from an explosion caused by Red Dart. As Richard Dragon recaps his history of his father Ricardo Diaz being killed by John Diggle, Green Arrow is then attacked by Brick. When Green Arrow claims that Richard Dragon has enlisted D-list supervillains, Killer Moth joins the fight and states that he is a C-list supervillain. As Brick, Killer Moth, and Red Dart beat Green Arrow senseless, he witnesses a group of arrows falling from the sky that was launched by his half-sister Emiko Queen who is in a Green Arrow costume.

Emiko has joined the fight against the Longbow Hunters as Green Arrow's "apprentice" much to the objection of Green Arrow. As Brick is nearly beaten to death by Green Arrow for harming Emiko, Killer Moth points a weapon at him which Green Arrow counters with a tornado arrow. Red Dart returns to the battle to take Emiko hostage only to be thumped in the back of her head by Naomi. Killer Moth then gives up Richard Dragon's location as Green Arrow insists that his friends look after Emiko. After Green Arrow left, Clock King appeared and revealed to the group that Richard Dragon double-crossed him and killed his men with him only following orders so that he would have the heads of Henry and Naomi. In addition, Clock King states that Richard Dragon wants to also hurt Green Arrow outside of killing him.

As Clock King is taken down by Emiko, Killer Moth appears to finish the job. While Green Arrow and John Diggle fight Richard Dragon, Count Vertigo is instructed to deter the police. Naomi defeats Killer Moth with charged darts. Tearing a stray arrow from through the palm of his hand, Diggle tosses it to Oliver, who then uses its razor tip to slice through Dragon's femoral artery. After noticing the chaos caused by Count Vertigo, Green Arrow and Diggle focus on helping the innocent lives that were injured.

Members
 Richard Dragon - Leader
 Brick
 Clock King - Associate
 Count Vertigo
 Killer Moth
 Red Dart

In other media
The Longbow Hunters appear in the seventh season of Arrow, consisting of Red Dart (portrayed by Holly Elissa), Kodiak (portrayed by Michael Jonsson), and Silencer (portrayed by Miranda Edwards). This version of the group are assassins feared by the League of Assassins who were presumed dead since the 1950s. In the present, they are hired by Ricardo Diaz to serve in his criminal empire and Diaz's financier Dante to kill Emiko Queen's mother Kazumi Adachi.

References

External links
 Longbow Hunters at DC Database

2014 comics debuts
Comics characters introduced in 2014
DC Comics supervillain teams